Compteromesa is a genus of midges in the non-biting midge family (Chironomidae).

Species
C. oconeensis Sæther, 1981

References

Chironomidae